Siphonaria pectinata, common name the striped false limpet, is a species of air-breathing sea snail or false limpet, a marine heterobranch gastropod mollusc in the family Siphonariidae.

Taxonomic status

Siphonaria pectinata (Linnaeus, 1758) was thought to be a widespread species with an Amphiatlantic distribution. A 2015 molecular study clearly distinguished three lineages with no apparent connectivity. These lineages are now treated as three separate species. They are named as S. pectinata, restricted to the eastern Atlantic and Mediterranean, S. naufragum (Stearns, 1872) from Florida and the Gulf of Mexico and S. placentula Menke, 1853 from the Cape Verde Archipelago.

The complete nucleotide sequence of the mitochondrial genome of Siphonaria pectinata has been available since 2008. As a result of this study, Grande et al. (2008) proposed that this species should be recognized as a member of the Opisthobranchia rather than the Pulmonata. It is now known that the Pulmonata are actually a group within the former Opisthobranchia and the term Heterobranchia is usually used to clarify this relationship.

Distribution 

This species lives high in the intertidal zone on rocky shores in the North Atlantic Ocean, and the Mediterranean Sea. Populations in the Eastern Atlantic in the Gulf of Mexico, Florida and the Florida Keys are now known to belong to the sibling species, Siphonaria naufragum.

References

 Gofas, S.; Le Renard, J.; Bouchet, P. (2001). Mollusca. in: Costello, M.J. et al. (eds), European Register of Marine Species: a check-list of the marine species in Europe and a bibliography of guides to their identification. Patrimoines Naturels. 50: 180-213

External links 

 
 Crocetta F. (2016). "Backdating the confirmed presence of Siphonaria pectinata (Gastropoda: Siphonariidae) along the northern Mediterranean shores, with a discussion on its status in the basin". Marine Biodiversity Records 9: 55. .
 Simone, L. R. L., & Seabra, M. I. G. (2017). "Shell and body structure of the plesiomorphic pulmonate marine limpet Siphonaria pectinata (Linnaeus, 1758) from Portugal (Gastropoda: Heterobranchia: Siphonariidae)". Folia Malacologica 25(3): 147-164. 

Siphonariidae
Gastropods described in 1758
Taxa named by Carl Linnaeus
Molluscs of the Atlantic Ocean
Molluscs of the Mediterranean Sea